John Sowders (December 10, 1866 – July 29, 1939) was a Major League Baseball pitcher. Sowders was the brother of fellow major leaguers Bill and Len Sowders.

Sources

19th-century baseball players
Major League Baseball pitchers
Indianapolis Hoosiers (AA) players
Kansas City Cowboys players
Brooklyn Ward's Wonders players
St. Paul Apostles players
Minneapolis Millers (baseball) players
Kansas City Blues (baseball) players
Spokane Bunchgrassers players
Birmingham Grays players
Minneapolis Minnies players
New Castle Salamanders players
Washington Little Senators players
Baseball players from Louisville, Kentucky
Burials at Crown Hill Cemetery
1866 births
1939 deaths